The 1991–92 All-Ireland Senior Club Hurling Championship was the 22nd staging of the All-Ireland Senior Club Hurling Championship, the Gaelic Athletic Association's premier inter-county club hurling tournament. The championship began on 18 August 1991 and ended on 29 March 1992.

Glenmore were the defending champions, however, they failed to qualify.

On 29 March 1992, Kiltormer won the championship following a 0-15 to 1-8 defeat of Birr in the All-Ireland final. This was their first All-Ireland title ever.

Cashel King Cormacs's Tommy Grogan was the championship's top scorer with 1-35.

Results

Connacht Senior Club Hurling Championship

First round

Quarter-final

Semi-final

Final

Leinster Senior Club Hurling Championship

First round

Quarter-finals

Semi-finals

Final

Munster Senior Club Hurling Championship

Quarter-finals

Semi-finals

Final

Ulster Senior Club Hurling Championship

First round

Quarter-finals

Semi-finals

Final

All-Ireland Senior Club Hurling Championship

Quarter-final

Semi-finals

Final

Top scorers

Overall

Single game

References

1991 in hurling
1992 in hurling
All-Ireland Senior Club Hurling Championship